The 2016 Kerry Senior Football Championship was the 115th edition of Kerry GAA's premier gaelic football tournament for senior teams in County Kerry, Ireland. The tournament consists of 17 teams (8 club teams and 9 divisional teams), with the winners representing Kerry in the Munster Senior Club Football Championship if they are a club team. If the winners are a divisional team the winners of the Kerry Club Football Championship represent the county.

The championship has a back-door format for the first two rounds before proceeding to a knock-out format. Generally, any team to lose two matches will be knocked out of the championship.

On 16 October 2016, Dr. Crokes won their 16th senior football championship when defeating Kenmare District in the final at Fitzgerald Stadium on a scoreline of 2-16 to 1-12.

South Kerry were the defending champions after they defeated Killarney Legion after extra time and a replay in the 2015 final.

Austin Stacks won the 2016 senior club championship having defeated Dr. Crokes in the final.

Milltown/Castlemaine were relegated on 1 October 2016 when losing the relegation final to Kilcummin. This ended their 5-year stay at senior level while Kilcummin preserved their top flight status which spans 19 season to 1998.

Format Structure Change
This year only 8 club teams are taking part in the championship instead of 11 as in previous years. This leaves a total of 8 clubs and 9 divisional team (17 in total). It was decided that only 8 divisional sides would take part so the 2 lowest ranked divisional sides from the previous 5 years would play off in a qualification match with the winner entering the draw for the 2016 County Championship proper.

Relegation (See below): The club team to be relegated from the Senior County Championship will be the same team to be relegated from the Senior Club Championship (The 8 senior clubs play off against each other in Round 1 of the Club Championship. The 4 losers enter a relegation playoff with the losers entering a relegation final. This loser will be relegated to the I.F.C. for 2017. Should a club reach the final of the County championship they will be exempt from the Relegation process in the Club championship).

The winner of the 2016 I.F.C. will be promoted to the 2017 Senior County and Club Championships.

Promoted to SFC from IFC in 2015
 None

Relegated from SFC to IFC in 2015
 Ardfert
 Laune Rangers
 St. Michael's/Foilmore

Participating Teams
The teams taking part in the 2016 Kerry Senior Football Championship are:

Qualification

It had been decided that only 8 of the 9 Divisional Teams would play in the Senior Championship. To decide which team would be excluded, all divisional teams were ranked on their performances in the County Championship over the most recent 5-year period (2011-2015 inclusive). These rankings were based on a win counting for 2 points and a draw counting for 1 point.

The 2 lowest placed sides were St. Brendan's and Shannon Rangers. These sides then met in a qualifier to decide who would make it into the championship proper. The loser of this qualifier will play the lowest ranked team on completion of the 2016 Championship, to decide the 8 group teams for the 2017 Championship, except in the event of more than one team giving a walk over in this year’s Championship. In that case the teams that conceded walkovers would play in the 2017 Championship Qualifier.

Group stage

Round 1 
The Qualification winner and the remaining 15 teams play in eight matches. The winners proceed to Round 2A while the losers play in Round 2B.

Round 2

Round 2A
The 8 winners from Round 1 play each other in this round. The winners proceed to the quarter finals while the losers play in Round 3.

Round 2B
The 8 losers from Round 1 play  each other in this round. The winners proceed to Round 3 while the losers exit the championship.

Round 3
The four Round 2A losers play the four Round 2B winners in this round. The four winners progress to the quarter-finals while the losers exit the championship.

Knock-Out Stage

Quarter-finals

The 4 Round 2A winners play the 4 Round 3 winners.

Semi-finals

Final

Relegation

The club team to be relegated from the Senior County Championship will be the same team to be relegated from the Senior Club Championship. The 8 senior clubs play off against each other in Round 1 of the Club Championship. The 4 losers enter a relegation playoff with the losers entering a relegation final. This loser will be relegated to the I.F.C. for 2017. Should a club reach the final of the County championship they will be exempt from the Relegation process in the Club championship.

Championship statistics

Miscellaneous

 Kenmare District qualify for the final for the first time since 1987.
 Dr Crokes overtake Laune Rangers and John Mitchels to go second in the roll of honor with a 10th title.
 Despite winning the 2015 Intermediate Championship St Mary's Cahersiveen don't move up to senior.

References

External links

Kerry Senior Football Championship
Kerry Senior Football Championship